Stanford Prison Experiment was an American punk rock band based in Los Angeles, California, whose name was a reference to the Stanford prison experiment conducted by psychologist Philip Zimbardo in 1971.

Members
Mario Jimenez – vocals
Mike Starkey - guitar, vocals
Mark Fraser – bass
Davey Latter – drums

Discography
Albums
Stanford Prison Experiment (1993, World Domination)
The Gato Hunch (1995, World Domination)
Wrecreation (1998, Island)

References

External links
Stanford Prison Experiment Myspace website
ARTISTdirect website

Alternative rock groups from California